Eero Olavi Heinäluoma (born 4 July 1955 in Kokkola) is a Finnish politician who has been serving as Member of the European Parliament since 2019. A former chairman of the Finnish Social Democratic Party, he was replaced in the party's leadership by Jutta Urpilainen in June 2008. He was Speaker of the Parliament of Finland 2011–2015.

Early life and education
Heinäluoma has studied political sciences, but has not finished his degree.

Political career

Career in national politics
Heinäluoma was elected chairman in June 2005, succeeding former Prime Minister Paavo Lipponen. He was the Minister of Finance of Finland from 2005 to 2007.

Heinäluoma held various posts in the Central Organisation of Finnish Trade Unions (SAK) from 1983 to 2003. He was a director in SAK from 2000 to 2003. Heinäluoma was appointed as party secretary in 2002 and in the 2003 elections, he was elected as a Member of Parliament from the Electoral District of Uusimaa. Ever since he took up the post of Party secretary he had, according to many, been groomed as Lipponen's heir.

He won on the first ballot, getting 201 of 350 votes. His rivals were Foreign Minister Erkki Tuomioja, with 138 votes, and Minister of Education Tuula Haatainen, with 11 votes.

As party chairman, Heinäluoma ordered a reshuffle of SDP cabinet ministers and assumed the position of Minister of Finance on 23 September 2005. In 2007 elections, the party led by Heinäluoma suffered a significant loss, losing 15% of their seats in the parliament, and having the worst result since 1962. The loss led to the resignation of Heinäluoma as the party chairman.

Heinäluoma was elected as the chairman of the Social Democratic parliamentary group in February 2010 and served in that position until becoming Speaker in June 2011.

In June 2016, Heinäluoma announced that he would not become his party's candidate for the 2018 presidential election due to his wife's recent death.

Member of the European Parliament, 2019–present
Heinäluoma became a Member of the European Parliament in the 2019 elections. He has since been serving as treasurer of the S&D Group, making him part of the leadership team around the group's chairwoman Iratxe García.

Heinäluoma joined the Committee on Economic and Monetary Affairs and the Parliament's delegation to the EU-Russia Parliamentary Cooperation Committee. He is also a member of the European Parliament Intergroup on Climate Change, Biodiversity and Sustainable Development, the European Parliament Intergroup on Trade Unions and the URBAN Intergroup.

Other activities
 National Audit Office of Finland (NAOF), Member of the advisory board (2017-2019)

References

External links

Official Website 

1955 births
Living people
People from Kokkola
Leaders of the Social Democratic Party of Finland
Deputy Prime Ministers of Finland
Ministers of Finance of Finland
Speakers of the Parliament of Finland
Members of the Parliament of Finland (2003–07)
Members of the Parliament of Finland (2007–11)
Members of the Parliament of Finland (2011–15)
Members of the Parliament of Finland (2015–19)
MEPs for Finland 2019–2024
Recipients of the Order of the Cross of Terra Mariana, 1st Class